Latin American Federation of the Society of Jesus (FLACSI) promotes the Ignatian model in the network of schools and organizations of the Society of Jesus in the Latin America and Caribbean area.

The federation includes 90 schools spread across Latin America. This network of Jesuit schools is part of the "Education Sector" of the Society of Jesus in Latin America, along with the international organizations Fe y Alegría and the Association of Universities Entrusted to the Society of Jesus in Latin America (AUSJAL), all being dependent on the Conference of Provincials for Latin America (CPAL).

The non-profit FLACSI along with CPAL were founded in 2001.

Related organizations
 Fe y Alegría
 Association of Universities Entrusted to the Society of Jesus in Latin America
 Pontifical Xavierian University
 Alberto Hurtado University

References  

Society of Jesus
Education in Latin America
Organizations based in Latin America